Sphacophilus cellularis is a species of sawfly in the family Argidae.

References

Further reading

External links

 

Argidae
Articles created by Qbugbot